Barekese Senior High School  ('Basec) is a coeducational high school in Barekese in the Ashanti Region of Ghana.

Location

History
The school was established in 2004 and school opened its doors to the first batch of 81 students on 11 October 2004.

The school's establishment was the brain-child of the people of Barekese. The community offered a six-classroom structure, which was the former Primary School for the Barekese Local School, and another block of classroom to house the administrative setup of the school. However, after so many years of toil and fruitless efforts, the Nwabiagya Rural Bank, with its headquarters at Barekese agreed to help establish the school. A school-implementation committee was, therefore, set up by the bank after several meetings with the Town's Unit Committees. Then, in 2004, the then Atwima District Assembly also joined efforts and provided some financial support to help put up some important physical structures in the school. Finally, the school was completed and opened on 11 October 2004.

See also

 Education in Ghana
 List of senior high schools in Ashanti Region

References

2004 establishments in Ghana
Ashanti Region
Educational institutions established in 2004
High schools in Ghana